Matthew Barton was the defending champion, but lost in the quarterfinal to Hiroki Moriya.

Klaln won the title, defeating Tatsuma Ito in the final, 6–3, 7–6(11–9).

Seeds

Draw

Finals

Top half

Bottom half

References
 Main Draw
 Qualifying Draw

Charles Sturt Adelaide International - Singles
2014 Singles
Charles Sturt Adelaide International - Singles